James O'Donnell (1774–1830) was a noted Irish-American architect in New York City and Montreal.

Biography 
James O’Donnell was born in County Wexford, Ireland, to a wealthy family of Anglo-Irish landowners. He became an architect.

In 1812, at the age of 38, O'Donnell migrated to the United States and took up residence in New York City, where he successfully practised as an architect. His major works in that city were the Bloomingdale Insane Asylum (1818–21, demolished c. 1892), the Fulton Market (1821–22, demolished 1936), and Christ Church (1822–23, destroyed by fire 1847). O’Donnell took his inspiration for the last building from the neo-Gothic style, which he favoured throughout his career. In 1817, he was elected to the American Academy of the Fine Arts in New York.

O’Donnell moved to Montreal to build the Notre-Dame Basilica from 1823 to 1829.

For some years James O’Donnell had suffered from edema, and from July 1829 his condition worsened. In November he dictated his will; at that point he decided to convert from Anglicanism to Roman Catholicism. He died shortly afterwards, on January 28, 1830. He is the only person buried in the crypt of the Basilica. O'Donnell converted to Catholicism on his deathbed, perhaps due to the realization that he might not be allowed to be buried in his church.

Gallery

Footnotes

External links
 Dictionary of Canadian Biography Online

1830 deaths
1774 births
Canadian people of Anglo-Irish descent
Converts to Roman Catholicism
Converts to Roman Catholicism from Anglicanism
Canadian architects
Gothic Revival architects
Irish architects
American emigrants to pre-Confederation Quebec